The 2022 African Weightlifting Championships were held in Cairo, Egypt from 28 to 31 October 2022. It were the 32nd men's and 21st women's championship and 1st African Clubs Weightlifting Championships.

Medal summary

Men
https://iwf.sport/2022/12/03/the-ita-asserts-apparent-anti-doping-rule-violations-against-4-weightlifters-prior-to-the-iwf-world-championships/

Ahmed Emad Mohamed , IWF Anti-Doping Rules

Women

Medal table
Ahmed Emad Mohamed DSQ

Ranking by Big (Total result) medals 

Ranking by all medals: Big (Total result) and Small (Snatch and Clean & Jerk)

Participating nations 
12 national teams took part in the competition.

References

External links
Results book

African Weightlifting Championships
African Weightlifting Championships
African Weightlifting Championships
International weightlifting competitions hosted by Egypt
African Weightlifting Championships
African Weightlifting Championships